Maxine Black may refer to:

Max Black, character in 2 Broke Girls
Maxine Black, character in Last Time Out played by Betty Buckley